Pandemis acumipenita is a species of moth of the family Tortricidae. It is found in Sichuan, China.

The length of the forewings is about 9 mm. The forewings are ochreous and the hindwings are pale brownish grey.

References

	

Moths described in 1983
Pandemis